Katherine Bucknell (born 1957 in Saigon) is an American scholar and novelist who resides in England.

Katherine Bucknell is the editor of W. H. Auden's Juvenilia and of three volumes of the diaries of Christopher Isherwood, as well as The Animals: Love Letters Between Christopher Isherwood and Don Bachardy.

She is the author of four novels: Canarino (2004), Leninsky Prospekt (2005), What You Will (2007), and +1 (2013).

References

External links
Katherine Bucknell's Official Website
Read Katherine Bucknell's articles on the 5th Estate blog

1957 births
21st-century British novelists
Living people
People from Ho Chi Minh City